Auchenheath railway station was just outside Auchenheath, a hamlet in the county of South Lanarkshire, Scotland. It was served by local trains on the Coalburn Branch south of Glasgow.

The nearest railway station to Auchenheath is now Lanark.

History
Opened by the Lesmahagow Railway, then joining the Caledonian Railway it became part of the London Midland and Scottish Railway during the Grouping of 1923. Passing on to the Scottish Region of British Railways during the nationalisation of 1948. It was then closed by the British Railways Board.

The site today
The station house still exists and there are remains of the platforms at the northern end.

References

 
 
 Station on navigable O.S. map

Disused railway stations in South Lanarkshire
Railway stations in Great Britain opened in 1866
Railway stations in Great Britain closed in 1951
1866 establishments in Scotland
Former Caledonian Railway stations